Meigs County Courthouse may refer to:
Meigs County Courthouse (Ohio) in Pomeroy, Ohio
Meigs County Courthouse (Tennessee) in Decatur, Tennessee
Old Meigs County Courthouse in Chester, Ohio